The Riot is a 1913 American short comedy film directed by Mack Sennett and starring Fatty Arbuckle.

Cast
 Phyllis Allen
 Roscoe 'Fatty' Arbuckle
 Alice Davenport
 Hank Mann
 Charles Murray
 Mabel Normand
 Ford Sterling
 Al St. John

See also
 List of American films of 1913
 Fatty Arbuckle filmography

References

External links

1913 films
1913 comedy films
1913 short films
Silent American comedy films
American silent short films
American black-and-white films
Films directed by Mack Sennett
American comedy short films
1910s American films